This is a list of seasons completed by the California Golden Bears men's college basketball team.

Seasons

 
 
 
 
 

 

 

 

 
 

 
 
 

 
 
 
 
 

 
 
 
 
 
 
 
 
 
 
 
 
 
 
 
 
 
 
 
 
 
 
 
 
 
 
 
 
 
 
 

 

 

 

 

 

 

 

 

 

 Bozeman was named acting head coach in February 1993 following the firing of Lou Campanelli; California credits the first 17 games of the regular season to Campanelli who went 10–7 and 4–5 in conference. The final 13 games (including the NCAA Tournament) were credited to Bozeman, who went 11–2 and 8–1 in conference.
 Entire 1994–95 season and all but two games of 1995–96 season forfeited by NCAA after it was discovered that Jelani Gardner was ineligible.  1996 NCAA Tournament appearance was vacated.  Cal's adjusted records are 0–27 (0–18 Pac–10) 1994–95, and 2–26 (2–16 Pac–10) in 1995–96.
 California's adjusted record under Bozeman was 35–63 (23–41 Pac–10).

References

California Golden Bears men's basketball seasons
California Golden Bears
California Golden Bears basketball seasons